Shannon Harbour a small village on the banks of the Grand Canal of Ireland.

The village has the  older/regional name Cluain Uaine Bheag meaning 'Clononey Beg' or 'little Clononey' after the distance and population and low laying land of the area in comparison to the other side of a stream off the River Brosna, this townsland is called Cluain Uaine Mhor/ Clononey Mor/ 'Big Clononey'.

The village has docking facilities and two pubs, McIntyre's and the Canal Bar. The Shannon Harbour boat rally is organised by the Shannon Harbour branch of the IWAI each year since 1971. The Shannon Harbour area lies between Griffith Bridge, a sharp hump-back twist over the Grand Canal and the Railway Bridge, a loop - around bridge over a hidden, derelict, railway.

The village is known as the place where the Shannon, Brosna and Grand Canal meet; a fishing destination for salmon, perch and pike.

In popular culture
There is an Irish tune by the name Uaine Bheagby the Irish group Slide.

See also
List of towns and villages in Ireland

Towns and villages in County Offaly
River Shannon